USS LST-326 was a  in the United States Navy during World War II. She was later sold to France as Liamone (K06).

Construction and career 
LST-326 was laid down on 12 November 1942 at Philadelphia Navy Yard, Philadelphia, Pennsylvania. Launched on 11 February 1943 and commissioned on 26 February 1943.

Service in the United States 
LST-326 became a Coast Guard manned vessel after her crew and officers were exchanged with USS LST-175 on 25 August 1943.

During World War II, LST-223 was assigned to the Europe-Africa-Middle East theater. She took part in the Invasion of Sicilian from 9 to 15 July 1943.

She participated in the Anzio-Nettuno landings from 22 January to 2 February 1944 and the Invasion of Normandy from 6 to 25 June 1944.

LST-326 was decommissioned on 18 December 1944 and transferred to the Royal Navy.

She was struck from the Navy Register on 26 February 1946.

Service in the United Kingdom 
HMS LST-326 was commissioned on 18 December 1944 and was part of W Task Force which participated in the recapture of Rangoon, before proceeding to the eventual invasion of Malaya at Morib and Port Swettenham, and to Singapore and Bangkok doing relief work repatriating ex P.O.W.s of the Japanese.

She was paid off to Singapore and returned to US Navy custody at Subic Bay, Philippines, 16 March 1946.

Not long after returning to the US, she was again sold to France on 5 April 1946.

Service in France 
She was transferred to the French Navy and commissioned on 5 April 1946 with the name Liamone (K06) and later reclassified as L9000.

Liamone took part in the First Indochina War between 19 December 1946 to 1 August 1954.

The ship was out of service in 1951 and later sold for scrap.

Awards 
LST-326 have earned the following awards:

 American Campaign Medal
 Europe-Africa-Middle East Campaign Medal (3 battle stars)
 World War II Victory Medal

Citations

Sources 

 
 
 
 

 

World War II amphibious warfare vessels of the United States
World War II amphibious warfare vessels of the United Kingdom
Ships built in Philadelphia
1943 ships
LST-1-class tank landing ships of the United States Navy
LST-1-class tank landing ships of the Royal Navy
Ships transferred from the United States Navy to the French Navy